Samuel di Castelnuovo, who lived at the end of the sixteenth century and the beginning of the seventeenth, was secretary of the Jewish community of Rome.

He edited and probably translated into Italian: 
 Judah ha-Levi's piyyut, Mi kamoka, Venice, 1609, recited on the Sabbath preceding the Feast of Purim.
 Moses Rieti's liturgic work, Ma'on ha-Shoalim, Venice, 1609. The name Castelnuovo occurs also in a halakic decision of Isaac Samuel Reggio on the ritual bath, inserted in Mashbit Milchamot, fol. 92.

Bibliography
Steinschneider, Moritz, Catalogus Librorum Hebræorum in Bibliotheca Bodleiana cols. 1988, 2410
—, in Monatsschrift, xliii. 92, 311
Mortara, Marco, Mazkeret Chakme Italiya: Indice Alfabetico dei Rabbini e Scrittori Israeliti di Cose Giudaiche in Italia, Padua, 1887
Berliner, Abraham, Geschichte der Juden in Rom, von der Aeltesten Zeit bis zur Gegenwart (2050 Jahre), 3 vols., 1893

Writers from Rome
16th-century Italian Jews
17th-century Italian Jews